Ricardo Ferriño Treviño (born 6 August 1991 in Torreón, Coahuila, Mexico) is a former Mexican footballer, who played as goalkeeper for the Las Vegas Lights in their inaugural season in the USL. On November 30, 2018, Las Vegas Lights FC announced that they had declined the option in Ferriño's contract.

References

External links
 

1991 births
Living people
Mexican expatriate footballers
Association football goalkeepers
Saltillo F.C. footballers
Alacranes de Durango footballers
Murciélagos FC footballers
Venados F.C. players
Las Vegas Lights FC players
Ascenso MX players
Liga Premier de México players
Footballers from Coahuila
Mexican footballers
Sportspeople from Torreón
Mexican people of Italian descent
Mexican expatriate sportspeople in the United States
Expatriate soccer players in the United States